is a Japanese manga series written by Aruma Arima and illustrated by Masuku Fukayama. It began serialization on Shueisha's Shōnen Jump+ manga website in December 2021. As of February 2023, the series' individual chapters have been collected into four volumes.

Plot summary
Make the Exorcist Fall in Love centers around a nameless priest, who from birth has been trained and abused by the Catholic church to defeat demons, to the point that he follows the Bible literally and casts his eye out while fighting the demon of lust. Advised by his mentor that he is too self-sacrificial, the priest receives a message from Satan stating that he intends for the creator of "The Gallery of Evil" to visit him in Gehenna. "The Gallery of Evil" turns out to be an art exhibition featuring demons falling in love, and is tasked by the church to protect Imuri Atsuki, the artist, from Satan's minions. Imuri is kind and loving towards the priest, but this is because Imuri holds a secret…

Characters 

 (2022 commercial)

 (2022 commercial)

Publication
Written by Aruma Arima and illustrated by Masuku Fukayama, the series began serialization on Shueisha's Shōnen Jump+ manga website on December 15, 2021. As of February 2023, the series' individual chapters have been collected into four tankōbon volumes.

Shueisha's Manga Plus service is publishing the series in English digitally.

Volume list

Reception
Reiichi Naruma from  praised the story, artwork, characters, and setting, particularly enjoying both the action and romance elements of the story. Steven Blackburn from Screen Rant favorably compared the series to Witch Watch, stating that Make the Exorcist Fall in Loves romantic moments and character dynamics were better than those found in Witch Watch.

The series was nominated for the 2022 Next Manga Award in the web manga category, and ranked ninth out of 50 nominees.

References

External links
  
 

Action anime and manga
Japanese webcomics
Romantic comedy anime and manga
Shōnen manga
Shueisha manga
Webcomics in print